The West End School is an academically rigorous, free boarding school in Louisville, Kentucky for boys, grades Pre-K through 8. The school was founded in 2005 by Robert Blair and his wife Debbie. In the first year of opening the school Mr. and Mrs. Blair shared a house on Chestnut Street with three middle school boys and commuted to a single classroom at an dilapidated. When they first opened the school they said wanted to start it as educational experiment with the belief that all children can achieve their highest potential if provided with an education imbued with high expectations, rigorous academics, and a supportive community.  Over the past 16 years they have grown to 140 students. The focus of the school is to help "at risk" boys from the West End neighborhoods of Louisville, Kentucky. It admits incoming sixth-graders who qualify for the free or reduced lunch program and who are capable of doing grade-level work. The West End School Thrives To Offer substantial counseling that support concerns with emotional, behavioral, academic hardships. Provides a small classroom setting to maximize the learning capability for the students. The school has school enrichment program for kids that are in pre-k and up. Students also have an option to participate in a 4-week summer program which includes academic courses, enrichment activities and travel opportunities which help to prevent "summer learning loss" between changing grades.The School is 100% accredited by the Independent School Association of the Central States.

The school is run like a traditional boarding school. The boys must get up each day at 6:45 and lights out is at 9:30. Dan Hall is the chairman of the school's board of directors. Also West End School offers housing to alumni attending high school, who benefit from living in our supportive and structured campus.The last school year there were 5 alumni students.

The school is located in the former Virginia Avenue Colored School, Louisville's first purpose-built segregated elementary school, which is listed on the National Register of Historic Places.

References 

About West End School. (n.d.). Retrieved December 2, 2021

Private middle schools in Kentucky
Educational institutions established in 2005
Private schools in Louisville, Kentucky
2005 establishments in Kentucky
Private elementary schools in Kentucky
Boarding schools in Kentucky